John Michael "Ozzy" Osbourne (born 3 December 1948) is an English singer, songwriter, and television personality. He rose to prominence during the 1970s as the lead vocalist of the heavy metal band Black Sabbath, during which period he adopted the nickname "Prince of Darkness".

Born and raised in Birmingham, Osbourne became a founding member of Black Sabbath in 1968, and provided lead vocals from their self-titled debut album in 1970 to Never Say Die! in 1978. The band was highly influential on the development of heavy metal music, in particular their critically acclaimed releases Paranoid, Master of Reality and Sabbath Bloody Sabbath. Osbourne was fired from Black Sabbath in 1979 due to alcohol and drug problems, but went on to have a successful solo career, releasing 13 studio albums, the first seven of which received multi-platinum certifications in the US. Osbourne has since reunited with Black Sabbath on several occasions. He rejoined in 1997 and helped record the group's final studio album, 13 (2013), before they embarked on a farewell tour that ended with a February 2017 performance in their hometown, Birmingham. His longevity and success have earned him the informal title "Godfather of Metal".

Osbourne's total album sales from his years in Black Sabbath, combined with his solo work, are over 100 million. He was inducted into the Rock and Roll Hall of Fame as a member of Black Sabbath and into the UK Music Hall of Fame as a solo artist and as a member of the band. He has been honoured with stars on the Hollywood Walk of Fame and Birmingham Walk of Stars. At the 2014 MTV Europe Music Awards, he received the Global Icon Award. In 2015, Osbourne received the Ivor Novello Award for Lifetime Achievement from the British Academy of Songwriters, Composers and Authors.

In the year 2002, Osbourne became a reality television star, appearing as himself in the MTV reality show The Osbournes alongside wife and manager Sharon and two of their three children, Kelly and Jack. He co-stars with Jack and Kelly in the television series  Ozzy & Jack's World Detour. The show's third season debuted in June 2018.

Early life
Osbourne was born at Marston Green Maternity Hospital near to Coleshill, but grew up in the Aston area of Birmingham. His mother, Lilian (née Unitt; 1916–2001), was a non-observant Catholic who worked days at a Lucas factory. His father, John Thomas "Jack" Osbourne (1915–1977), worked night shifts as a toolmaker at the General Electric Company. Osbourne has three older sisters, Jean, Iris, and Gillian, and two younger brothers, Paul and Tony. The family lived in a small two-bedroom home at 14 Lodge Road in Aston. Osbourne has had the nickname "Ozzy" since primary school. Osbourne dealt with dyslexia at school. At the age of 11, he was picked on by school bullies.  Osbourne claimed to have attempted suicide multiple times as a teenager. He left school at 15 and was employed as a construction site labourer, trainee plumber, apprentice toolmaker, car factory horn-tuner, and abattoir worker. While young he dabbled in crime and spent six weeks in Winson Green Prison when he was unable to pay a fine after being convicted of burgling a clothes shop; to teach his son a lesson, his father refused to pay the fine.

Drawn to the stage, he took part in school plays such as Gilbert and Sullivan's The Mikado and HMS Pinafore. He possesses a "hesitant" Brummie accent. Upon hearing their first hit single at age 14, Osbourne became a fan of the Beatles. He credits their 1963 song "She Loves You" for inspiring him to become a musician. He said in the 2011 documentary God Bless Ozzy Osbourne, "I knew I was going to be a rock star the rest of my life."

Career

Black Sabbath

In late 1967, Geezer Butler formed his first band, Rare Breed, and soon recruited Osbourne to serve as vocalist. The band played two shows, then broke up. Osbourne and Butler reunited in Polka Tulk Blues, along with guitarist Tony Iommi and drummer Bill Ward, whose band Mythology had recently broken up. They renamed themselves Earth, but after being accidentally booked for a show instead of a different band with the same name, they decided to change their name again. They finally settled on the name Black Sabbath in August 1969, based on the film of the same title. The band had noticed how people enjoyed being frightened; inspired, the band decided to play a heavy blues style of music laced with gloomy sounds and lyrics. While recording their first album, Butler read an occult book and woke up seeing a dark figure at the end of his bed. Butler told Osbourne about it and together they wrote the lyrics to "Black Sabbath", their first song in a darker vein.

Despite only a modest investment from their US record label Warner Bros. Records, Black Sabbath met with swift and enduring success. Built around Tony Iommi's guitar riffs, Geezer Butler's lyrics, Bill Ward's dark tempo drumbeats, and topped by Osbourne's eerie vocals, early records such as their debut album Black Sabbath and Paranoid sold huge numbers, as well as getting considerable airplay. Osbourne recalls a band lament, "in those days, the band wasn't very popular with the women".

At about this time, Osbourne first met his future wife, Sharon Arden. After the unexpected success of their first album, Black Sabbath were considering her father, Don Arden, as their new manager, and Sharon was at that time working as Don's receptionist. Osbourne admits he was attracted to her immediately but assumed that "she probably thought I was a lunatic". Osbourne said years later that the best thing about eventually choosing Don Arden as manager was that he got to see Sharon regularly, though their relationship was strictly professional at that point.

Just five months after the release of Paranoid, the band released Master of Reality. The album reached the top ten in both the United States and UK, and was certified gold in less than two months. In the 1980s it received platinum certification and went Double Platinum in the early 21st century. Reviews of the album were unfavourable. Lester Bangs of Rolling Stone famously dismissed Master of Reality as "naïve, simplistic, repetitive, absolute doggerel", although the very same magazine would later place the album at number 298 on their 500 Greatest Albums of All Time list, compiled in 2003. Black Sabbath's Volume 4 was released in September 1972. Critics were again dismissive of the album, yet it achieved gold status in less than a month. It was the band's fourth consecutive release to sell one million copies in the United States.

In November 1973, Black Sabbath released the critically acclaimed Sabbath Bloody Sabbath. For the first time, the band received favourable reviews in the mainstream press. Gordon Fletcher of Rolling Stone called the album "an extraordinarily gripping affair", and "nothing less than a complete success". Decades later, AllMusic's Eduardo Rivadavia called the album a "masterpiece, essential to any heavy metal collection", while also claiming the band displayed "a newfound sense of finesse and maturity". The album marked the band's fifth consecutive platinum selling album in the US. Sabotage was released in July 1975. Again there were favourable reviews. Rolling Stone stated, "Sabotage is not only Black Sabbath's best record since Paranoid, it might be their best ever." In a retrospective review, AllMusic was less favourable, noting that "the magical chemistry that made such albums as Paranoid and Volume 4 so special was beginning to disintegrate". Technical Ecstasy, released on 25 September 1976, was also met with mixed reviews. AllMusic gives the album two stars, and notes that the band was "unravelling at an alarming rate".

Dismissal

In 1978, Osbourne left the band for three months to pursue a solo project he called Blizzard of Ozz, a title which had been suggested by his father. Three members of the band Necromandus, who had supported Sabbath in Birmingham when they were called Earth, backed Osbourne in the studio and briefly became the first incarnation of his solo band.

At the request of the other members, Osbourne rejoined Sabbath. The band spent five months at Sounds Interchange Studios in Toronto, Canada, writing and recording what would become the album Never Say Die! "It took quite a long time", Iommi said. "We were getting really drugged out, doing a lot of dope. We'd go down to the sessions, and have to pack up because we were too stoned; we'd have to stop. Nobody could get anything right, we were all over the place, everybody's playing a different thing. We'd go back and sleep it off, and try again the next day."

Touring in support of Never Say Die! began in May 1978 with openers Van Halen. Reviewers called Sabbath's performance "tired and uninspired", in stark contrast to the "youthful" performance of Van Halen, who were touring the world for the first time. The band filmed a performance at the Hammersmith Odeon in June 1978, released on video as Never Say Die. The final show of the tour – and Osbourne's last appearance with the band until 1985 – was in Albuquerque, New Mexico on 11 December.

In 1979, back in the studio, tension and conflict arose between the members. Osbourne recalls being asked to record his vocals over and over, and tracks being manipulated endlessly by Iommi. This was a point of contention between Osbourne and Iommi. At Iommi's insistence, and with the support of Butler and Ward, Osbourne was ejected from the band on 27 April 1979. The reasons provided to him were that he was unreliable and had excessive substance use issues compared to the other members. Osbourne claims his drug use and alcohol consumption at that time was neither better nor worse than that of the other members.

The band replaced him with former Rainbow singer Ronnie James Dio. "I was not, and never will be, Ozzy Osbourne," Dio noted. "He was the vocalist and songwriter in that era who helped create that band and make it what it was, and what it is in its classic form."

Conflict had existed between Iommi and Osbourne from the beginning. When responding to a 1969 flyer reading "Ozzy Zig Needs Gig- has own PA" posted in a record store, Iommi and Ward arrived at the listed address to speak with Ozzy Zig. When Iommi saw Osbourne emerge from another room of the house, he left upon discovering it was the same "pest" he knew from growing up, as he knew of and disliked Osbourne from back in their school days. Iommi had reportedly "punched out" Osbourne numerous times over the years when the singer's drunken antics had become too much to take. Iommi recalls one incident in the early 1970s in which Osbourne and Butler were fighting in a hotel room. Iommi pulled Osbourne off Butler in an attempt to break up the drunken fight, and the vocalist proceeded to turn around and take a wild swing at him. Iommi responded by knocking Osbourne unconscious with one punch to the jaw.

Solo career
On leaving Sabbath, Osbourne recalled, "I'd got £96,000 for my share of the name, so I'd just locked myself away and spent three months doing coke and booze. My thinking was, 'This is my last party, because after this I'm going back to Birmingham and the dole." However, Don Arden signed him to Jet Records with the aim of recording new material. Arden dispatched his daughter Sharon to Los Angeles to "look after Ozzy's needs, whatever they were", to protect his investment. Initially, Arden hoped Osbourne would return to Sabbath (who he was personally managing at that time), and later attempted to convince the singer to name his new band "Son of Sabbath", which Osbourne hated. Sharon attempted to convince Osbourne to form a supergroup with guitarist Gary Moore. "When I lived in Los Angeles", Moore recalled, "[Moore's band] G-Force helped him to audition musicians. If drummers were trying out, I played guitar, and if a bassist came along, my drummer would help out. We felt sorry for him, basically. He was always hovering around trying to get me to join, and I wasn't having any of it."

In late 1979, under the management of the Ardens, Osbourne formed the Blizzard of Ozz, featuring drummer Lee Kerslake (of Uriah Heep), bassist-lyricist Bob Daisley (of Rainbow and, later, Uriah Heep), keyboardist Don Airey (of Rainbow and, later, Deep Purple), and guitarist Randy Rhoads (of Quiet Riot). The record company would eventually title the group's debut album Blizzard of Ozz, credited simply to Osbourne, thus commencing his solo career. Co-written with Daisley and Rhoads, it brought Osbourne considerable success on his first solo effort. Though it is generally accepted that Osbourne and Rhoads started the band, Daisley later claimed that he and Osbourne formed the band in England before Rhoads officially joined.

Blizzard of Ozz is one of the few albums amongst the 100 best-sellers of the 1980s to have achieved multi-platinum status without the benefit of a top-40 single. As of August 1997, it had achieved quadruple platinum status, according to RIAA. "I envied Ozzy's career…" remarked former Sabbath drummer Bill Ward. "He seemed to be coming around from whatever it was that he'd gone through and he seemed to be on his way again; making records and stuff… I envied it because I wanted that… I was bitter. And I had a thoroughly miserable time."

Osbourne's second album, Diary of a Madman, featured more songs co-written with Lee Kerslake. For his work on this album and Blizzard of Ozz, Rhoads was ranked the 85th-greatest guitarist of all time by Rolling Stone magazine in 2003. This album is known for the singles "Over the Mountain" and "Flying High Again" and, as Osbourne explains in his autobiography, is his personal favourite. Tommy Aldridge and Rudy Sarzo soon replaced Kerslake and Daisley. Aldridge had been Osbourne's original choice for drummer, but a commitment to Gary Moore had made him unavailable. Sarzo had played in Quiet Riot with Rhoads, who recommended him for the position.

On 19 March 1982, the band were in Florida for the Diary of a Madman tour, and a week away from playing Madison Square Garden in New York City. A light aircraft piloted by Andrew Aycock (the band's tour bus driver) – carrying Rhoads and Rachel Youngblood, the band's costume and make-up designer – crashed while performing low passes over the band's tour bus. The left wing of the aircraft clipped the bus, causing the plane to graze a tree and crash into the garage of a nearby mansion, killing Rhoads, Aycock, and Youngblood. The crash was ruled the result of "poor judgement by the pilot in buzzing the bus and misjudging clearance of obstacles". Experiencing firsthand the horrific death of his close friend and bandmate, Osbourne fell into a deep depression. The tour was cancelled for two weeks while Osbourne, Sharon, and Aldridge returned to Los Angeles to take stock while Sarzo remained in Florida with family.

Gary Moore was the first to be approached to replace Rhoads, but refused. With a two-week deadline to find a new guitarist and resume the tour, Robert Sarzo, brother of the band's bassist Rudy Sarzo, was chosen to replace Rhoads. However, former Gillan guitarist Bernie Tormé had flown to California from England with the promise from Jet Records that he had the job. Once Sharon realised that Jet Records had already paid Tormé an advance, he was reluctantly hired instead of Sarzo. The tour resumed on 1 April 1982, but Tormé's blues-based style was unpopular with fans. After a handful of shows he informed Sharon that he would be returning to England to continue work on a solo album he had begun before coming to America. At an audition in a hotel room, Osbourne selected Night Ranger's Brad Gillis to finish the tour. The tour culminated in the release of the 1982 live album Speak of the Devil, recorded at the Ritz in New York City. A live tribute album for Rhoads was also later released. Despite the difficulties, Osbourne moved on after Rhoads' death. Speak of the Devil, known in the United Kingdom as Talk of the Devil, was originally planned to consist of live recordings from 1981, primarily from Osbourne's solo work. Under contract to produce a live album, it ended up consisting entirely of Sabbath covers recorded with Gillis, Sarzo and Tommy Aldridge.

In 1982, Osbourne appeared as lead vocalist on the Was (Not Was) pop dance track "Shake Your Head (Let's Go to Bed)". Remixed and rereleased in the early 1990s for a Was (Not Was) hits album in Europe, it reached number four on the UK Singles Chart. In 1983, Jake E. Lee, formerly of Ratt and Rough Cutt, joined Osbourne to record Bark at the Moon. The album, cowritten with Daisley, featured Aldridge and former Rainbow keyboard player Don Airey. The album contains the fan favourite "Bark at the Moon". The music video for "Bark at the Moon" was partially filmed at the Holloway Sanitorium outside London, England. Within weeks the album became certified gold. It has sold three million copies in the US. 1986's The Ultimate Sin followed (with bassist Phil Soussan and drummer Randy Castillo), and touring behind both albums with former Uriah Heep keyboardist John Sinclair joining prior to the Ultimate Sin tour. At the time of its release, The Ultimate Sin was Osbourne's highest-charting studio album. The RIAA awarded the album Platinum status on 14 May 1986, soon after its release; it was awarded Double Platinum status on 26 October 1994.

Jake E. Lee and Osbourne parted ways in 1987. Osbourne continued to struggle with chemical dependency. That year he commemorated the fifth anniversary of Rhoads' death with Tribute, a collection of live recordings from 1981. In 1988 Osbourne appeared in The Decline of Western Civilization Part II: The Metal Years and told the director Penelope Spheeris that "sobriety fucking sucks". Meanwhile, Osbourne found Zakk Wylde, who was the most enduring replacement for Rhoads to date. Together they recorded No Rest for the Wicked with Castillo on drums, Sinclair on keyboards, and Daisley co-writing lyrics and playing bass. The subsequent tour saw Osbourne reunited with erstwhile Black Sabbath bandmate Geezer Butler on bass. A live EP (entitled Just Say Ozzy) featuring Geezer was released two years later. In 1988, Osbourne performed on the rock ballad "Close My Eyes Forever", a duet with Lita Ford, reaching No. 8 on the Billboard Hot 100. In 1989 Osbourne performed at the Moscow Music Peace Festival.

Successful through the 1980s, Osbourne sustained commercial success into the 1990s, starting with 1991's No More Tears, featuring "Mama, I'm Coming Home". The album enjoyed much radio and MTV exposure. It also initiated a practice of bringing in outside composers to help pen Osbourne's solo material instead of relying on his recording ensemble. The album was mixed by veteran rock producer Michael Wagener. Osbourne was awarded a Grammy Award for the track "I Don't Want to Change the World" from Live & Loud, for Best Metal Performance of 1994. Wagener also mixed the live album Live & Loud released on 28 June 1993. Intended to be Osbourne's final album, it went platinum four times over, and ranked at number 10 on that year's Billboard rock charts. At this point Osbourne expressed his fatigue with touring, and proclaimed his "retirement tour" (which was to be short-lived). It was called "No More Tours", a pun on No More Tears. Alice in Chains' Mike Inez took over on bass and Kevin Jones played keyboards as Sinclair was touring with the Cult.

Osbourne's entire CD catalogue was remastered and reissued in 1995. In 1995 Osbourne released Ozzmosis and returned to touring, dubbing his concert performances "The Retirement Sucks Tour". The album reached number 4 on the US Billboard 200. The RIAA certified the album gold and platinum in that same year, and double platinum in April 1999.

The line-up on Ozzmosis was Wylde, Butler (who had just quit Black Sabbath again) and former Bad English, Steve Vai and Hardline drummer Deen Castronovo, who later joined Journey. Keyboards were played by Rick Wakeman and producer Michael Beinhorn. The tour maintained Butler and Castronovo and saw Sinclair return, but a major line-up change was the introduction of former David Lee Roth guitarist Joe Holmes. Wylde was considering an offer to join Guns N' Roses. Unable to wait for a decision on Wylde's departure, Osbourne replaced him. In early 1996, Butler and Castronovo left. Inez and Randy Castillo (Lita Ford, Mötley Crüe) filled in. Ultimately, Faith No More's Mike Bordin and former Suicidal Tendencies and future Metallica bassist Robert Trujillo joined on drums and bass respectively. A greatest hits package, The Ozzman Cometh, was issued in 1997.

Ozzfest

Osbourne's biggest financial success of the 1990s was a venture named Ozzfest, created and managed by his wife/manager Sharon and assisted by his son Jack. The first Ozzfest was held in Phoenix, Arizona, on 25 October 1996 and in Devore, California, on 26 October. Ozzfest was an instant hit with metal fans, helping many up-and-coming groups who were featured there to broad exposure and commercial success. Some acts shared the bill with a reformed Black Sabbath during the 1997 Ozzfest tour, beginning in West Palm Beach, Florida. Osbourne reunited with the original members of Sabbath in 1997 and has performed periodically with them since.

Since its beginning, five million people have attended Ozzfest which has grossed over US$100 million. The festival helped promote many new hard rock and heavy metal acts of the late 1990s and early 2000s. Ozzfest helped Osbourne to become the first hard rock and heavy metal star to hit $50 million in merchandise sales. In 2005, Osbourne and his wife Sharon starred in an MTV competition reality show entitled "Battle for Ozzfest". A number of yet unsigned bands send one member to compete in a challenge to win a spot on the 2005 Ozzfest and a possible recording contract. Shortly after Ozzfest 2005, Osbourne announced that he will no longer headline Ozzfest. Although he announced his retirement from Ozzfest, Osbourne came back headlining the tour. In 2006 Osbourne closed the event for just over half the concerts, leaving the others to be closed by System of a Down. He also played the closing act for the second stage at Shoreline Amphitheatre in Mountain View, California on 1 July as well as Randalls Island, New York on 29 July. After the concert in Bristol, Virginia, Osbourne announced he would return for another year of Ozzfest in 2007.

Tickets for the 2007 tour were offered to fans free of charge, which led to some controversy. In 2008, Ozzfest was reduced to a one-day event in Dallas, where Osbourne played, along with Metallica and King Diamond. In 2010, Osbourne appeared as the headliner closing the show after opening acts Halford and Mötley Crüe. The tour, though small (only six US venues and one UK venue were played), generated rave reviews.

2000s

Down to Earth, Osbourne's first album of new studio material in six years, was released on 16 October 2001. A live album, Live at Budokan, followed in 2002. Down to Earth, which achieved platinum status in 2003, featured the single "Dreamer", a song which peaked at number 10 on Billboards Mainstream Rock Tracks. In June 2002, Osbourne was invited to participate in the Golden Jubilee of Queen Elizabeth II, performing the Black Sabbath anthem "Paranoid" at the Party at the Palace concert in the grounds of Buckingham Palace. In 2003, Osbourne recruited former Metallica bassist Jason Newsted, though his time with Osbourne would be short. Interestingly, Osbourne's former bassist Robert Trujillo replaced Newsted in Metallica during this same period.

On 8 December 2003, Osbourne was rushed into emergency surgery at Slough's Wexham Park Hospital when he had an accident with his quad bike on his estate in Jordans, Buckinghamshire. Osbourne broke his collar bone, eight ribs, and a neck vertebra. An operation was performed to lift the collarbone, which was believed to be resting on a major artery and interrupting blood flow to the arm. Sharon later revealed that Osbourne had stopped breathing following the crash and was resuscitated by Osbourne's then personal bodyguard, Sam Ruston. While in hospital, Osbourne achieved his first ever UK number one single, a duet of the Black Sabbath ballad, "Changes" with daughter Kelly. In doing so, he broke the record of the longest period between an artist's first UK chart appearance (with Black Sabbath's "Paranoid", number four in August 1970) and their first number one hit: a gap of 33 years. Since the quad accident, apart from some short-term memory problems, he fully recovered and headlined the 2004 Ozzfest, in the reunited Black Sabbath.

In March 2005, Osbourne released a box set called Prince of Darkness. The first and second discs are collections of live performances, B-sides, demos and singles. The third disc contained duets and other odd tracks with other artists, including "Born to Be Wild" with Miss Piggy. The fourth disc, is entirely new material where Osbourne covers his favourite songs by his biggest influences and favourite bands, including the Beatles, John Lennon, David Bowie and others. In November 2005, Osbourne released the covers album Under Cover, featuring 10 songs from the fourth disc of Prince of Darkness and 3 more songs. Osbourne's band for this album included Alice in Chains guitarist Jerry Cantrell, bassist Chris Wyse and Faith No More drummer Mike Bordin.

Osbourne also helped judge the 2005 UK series of the X-Factor where his wife Sharon was one of the main judges. In March 2006, he said that he hoped to release a new studio album soon with longtime on-off guitarist, Zakk Wylde of Black Label Society. In October 2006, it was announced that Tony Iommi, Ronnie James Dio, Vinny Appice, and Geezer Butler would be touring together again, though not as Black Sabbath, but under the moniker Heaven and Hell (the title of Dio's first Black Sabbath album).

Osbourne's next album, titled Black Rain, was released on 22 May 2007. His first new studio album in almost six years, it featured a more serious tone than previous albums. "I thought I'd never write again without any stimulation... But you know what? Instead of picking up the bottle I just got honest and said, 'I don't want life to go [to pieces]'", Osbourne stated to Billboard magazine.

Osbourne revealed in July 2009 that he was currently seeking a new guitar player. While he states that he has not fallen out with Zakk Wylde, he said he felt his songs were beginning to sound like Black Label Society and fancied a change. In August 2009, Osbourne performed at the gaming festival BlizzCon with a new guitarist in his line-up, Gus G. Osbourne also provided his voice and likeness to the video game Brütal Legend character The Guardian of Metal. In November, Slash featured Osbourne on vocals in his single "Crucify the Dead", and Osbourne with wife Sharon were guest hosts on WWE Raw. In December, Osbourne announced he would be releasing a new album titled Soul Sucka with Gus G, Tommy Clufetos on drums, and Blasko on bass. Negative fan feedback was brought to Osbourne's attention regarding the album title. In respect of fan opinion, on 29 March Osbourne announced his album would be renamed Scream.

2010s
On 13 April 2010, Osbourne announced the release date for Scream would be 15 June 2010. The release date was later changed to a week later. A single from the album, "Let Me Hear You Scream", debuted on 14 April 2010 episode of CSI: NY. The song spent eight weeks on the Billboard Rock Songs chart, peaking at No. 7.

On 9 August 2010, Osbourne announced that the second single from the album would be "Life Won't Wait" and the video for the song would be directed by his son Jack. When asked of his opinions on Scream in an interview, Osbourne announced that he is "already thinking about the next album". Osbourne's current drummer, Tommy Clufetos, has reflected this sentiment, saying that "We are already coming up with new ideas backstage, in the hotel rooms and at soundcheck and have a bunch of ideas recorded". In October 2014, Osbourne released Memoirs of a Madman, a collection celebrating his entire solo career. A CD version contained 17 singles from across his career, never before compiled together. The DVD version contained music videos, live performances, and interviews.

In August 2015, Epic Records president Sylvia Rhone confirmed with Billboard that Osbourne was working on another studio album; in September 2019, Osbourne announced he had finished the album in four weeks following his collaboration with Post Malone. In April 2017, it was announced that guitarist Zakk Wylde would reunite with Osbourne for a summer tour to mark the 30th anniversary of their first collaboration on 1988's No Rest for the Wicked. The first show of the tour took place on 14 July at the Rock USA Festival in Oshkosh, Wisconsin.

On 6 November 2017, Ozzy was announced as the headline act for the Sunday of the 2018 Download Festival held annually at Donington Park in Leicestershire, England. Having previously graced the main stage in previous years fronting Black Sabbath, this will be his first-ever Download headline solo appearance. The Download Festival set comes as part of Osbourne's final world tour announcement that morning.

On 6 February 2018, Osbourne announced that he would embark on his final world tour dubbed No More Tours II, a reference to his 1992 tour of the same name, with support from Stone Sour on the North American portion of the tour. He later insisted that he would not retire, "It's 'No More Tours', so I'm just not doing world tours anymore. I'm still going to be doing gigs, but I'm not going on tour for six months at a time anymore. I'd like to spend some time at home."

On 6 September 2019, Osbourne featured on the song "Take What You Want" by Post Malone. The song would peak on the Billboard Hot 100 charts at number 8, making it Osbourne's first US Top 10 single in 30 years since he was featured on Lita Ford's "Close My Eyes Forever".

2020s 
On 21 February 2020, Osbourne released his first solo album in almost ten years, Ordinary Man, which received positive reviews from music critics and debuted at number three on the UK Albums Chart. A few days after the release, Osbourne told iHeartRadio that he wanted to make another album with Andrew Watt, the main producer of Ordinary Man. One week after the release of the album, an 8-bit video game dedicated to Osbourne was released, called Legend of Ozzy. Osbourne has started working on his follow up album, once again with Andrew Watt. In November 2021, Sony announced that Osbourne's album will be released within six months; it was also announced that Zakk Wylde will have full involvement in the album following his absence on Ordinary Man. On 24 June 2022, Osbourne announced his thirteenth album would be titled Patient Number 9 and released the title track along with an accompanying music video that same day. The album was released on 9 September 2022.

In January 2023, Osbourne announced that the European leg of the No More Tours II would be canceled after almost two years of being postponed. Osbourne effectively retired from touring, citing his accident in 2019 which resulted in the singer suffering spinal damage, while affirming his plan to continue performing in a more limited context.

Black Sabbath reunion

It was announced on 11 November 2011 during a news conference at the Whisky a Go Go club on West Hollywood's Sunset Strip that the original Black Sabbath line up of Ozzy, Tony Iommi, Geezer Butler, and Bill Ward would reunite for a world tour and new album, to be produced by Rick Rubin. Bill Ward dropped out for contractual reasons, but the project continued with Rage Against the Machine's Brad Wilk stepping in for Ward on drums. On 21 May 2012, Black Sabbath played at the O2 Academy in their hometown Birmingham, their first concert since their reunion. The album, entitled 13, was released 11 June 2013, and topped both the UK Albums Chart and the US Billboard 200.

In January 2016, the band began a farewell tour, titled "The End",  signifying the final performances of Black Sabbath. 
The final shows of The End tour took place at the Genting Arena in their home city of Birmingham, England on 2 and 4 February 2017, with Tommy Clufetos replacing Bill Ward as the drummer for the final show.

On 8 August 2022, Osbourne and Iommi made a surprise appearance, during the closing ceremony of the 2022 Commonwealth Games in Birmingham. This marked Osbourne's first live performance in three years, following a period of ill health.

Other production work
Osbourne achieved greater celebrity status via his own brand of reality television. The Osbournes, a series featuring the domestic life of Osbourne and his family (wife Sharon, children Jack and Kelly, occasional appearances from his son Louis, but eldest daughter Aimee did not participate). The program became one of MTV's greatest hits. It premiered on 5 March 2002, and the final episode aired on 21 March 2005. 

The success of The Osbournes led Osbourne and the rest of his family to host the 30th Annual American Music Awards in January 2003. The night was marked with constant "bleeping" due to some of the lewd and raunchy remarks made by Ozzy and Sharon Osbourne. Presenter Patricia Heaton walked out midway in disgust. On 20 February 2008, Ozzy, Sharon, Kelly and Jack Osbourne hosted the 2008 BRIT Awards held at Earls Court, London. Ozzy appeared in a TV commercial for I Can't Believe It's Not Butter! which began airing in the UK in February 2006. Ozzy appears in a commercial for the online video game World of Warcraft. He was also featured in the music video game Guitar Hero World Tour as a playable character. He becomes unlocked upon completing "Mr. Crowley" and "Crazy Train" in the vocalist career.

Osbourne published an autobiography in October 2009, titled I Am Ozzy. Osbourne says ghost writer Chris Ayres told the singer he has enough material for a second book. A movie adaptation of I Am Ozzy is also in the works, and Osbourne says he hopes "an unknown guy from England" will get the role over an established actor, while Sharon stated she would choose established English actress Carey Mulligan to play her.

A documentary film about Osbourne's life and career, entitled God Bless Ozzy Osbourne, premiered in April 2011 at the Tribeca Film Festival and was released on DVD in November 2011. The film was produced by Osbourne's son Jack. On 15 May 2013 Osbourne, along with the current members of Black Sabbath, appeared in an episode of CSI: Crime Scene Investigation titled "Skin in the Game". The History Channel premiered a comedy reality television series starring Ozzy Osbourne and his son Jack Osbourne on 24 July 2016 named Ozzy & Jack's World Detour. During each episode Ozzy and Jack visit one or more sites to learn about history from experts, and explore unusual or quirky aspects of their background.

Osbourne appeared in a November 2017 episode of Gogglebox along with other UK celebrities such as Ed Sheeran, former Oasis frontman Liam Gallagher, and Labour Party leader Jeremy Corbyn as part of Channel 4 and Cancer Research UK's Stand Up to Cancer fundraising campaign. In November 2017, Osbourne entered into a new realm of sponsorship as he signed on as an ambassador of a rock-themed online casino known as Metal Casino, which was founded by metal music fans in August 2017. In February 2019, Osbourne's merchandising partner announced that Ozzy would have his own branded online slots game as part of the NetEnt Rocks music-themed portfolio.

Awards

Osbourne has received several awards for his contributions to the music community. In 1994, he was awarded a Grammy Award for the track "I Don't Want to Change the World" from Live & Loud for Best Metal Performance of 1994. At the 2004 NME Awards in London, Osbourne received the award for Godlike Genius. In 2005 Osbourne was inducted into the UK Music Hall of Fame both as a solo artist and as a member of Black Sabbath. In 2006, he was inducted into the US Rock and Roll Hall of Fame with Black Sabbath bandmates Tony Iommi, Bill Ward, and Geezer Butler.

In 2007 Osbourne was honoured at the second annual VH1 Rock Honors, along with Genesis, Heart, and ZZ Top. In addition, that year a bronze star honouring Osbourne was placed on Broad Street in Birmingham, England while Osbourne watched. On 18 May Osbourne had received notice that he would be the first inductee into The Birmingham Walk of Stars. He was presented the award by the Lord Mayor of Birmingham. "I am really honoured", he said, "All my family is here and I thank everyone for this reception—I'm absolutely knocked out".

In 2008 Osbourne was crowned with the prestigious Living Legend award in the Classic Rock Roll of Honour Awards. Past recipients include Alice Cooper, Lemmy, Jimmy Page. Slash, the former Guns N' Roses guitarist, presented the award. In 2010 Osbourne won the "Literary Achievement" honour for his memoir, I Am Ozzy, at the Guys Choice Awards at Sony Pictures Studio in Culver City, California. Osbourne was presented with the award by Sir Ben Kingsley. The book debuted at No. 2 on the New York Times' hardcover non-fiction best-seller list. Osbourne was also a judge for the 6th, 10th and 11th annual Independent Music Awards to support independent artists' careers. In May 2015, Osbourne received the Ivor Novello Award for Lifetime Achievement from the British Academy of Songwriters, Composers and Authors at a ceremony held at the Grosvenor House Hotel, London. In 2016, Osbourne had a tram named after him in his home city of Birmingham.

In April 2021, Osbourne was inducted into the celebrity wing of the WWE Hall of Fame for his various appearances, notably for his appearance at WrestleMania 2 in 1986 when he and Lou Albano managed The British Bulldogs (Davey Boy Smith and The Dynamite Kid) in their WWF Tag Team Championship win over The Dream Team (Greg Valentine and Brutus Beefcake).

Personal life
In 1971, Osbourne met his first wife Thelma (née Riley) at a nightclub in Birmingham called the Rum Runner, where she worked. They were married later that year and children Jessica and Louis were soon born. Osbourne later referred to his first marriage as "a terrible mistake". His drug and alcohol use, coupled with his frequent absences while touring with Black Sabbath, took their toll on his family life; his children later complained that he was not a good father. In the 2011 documentary film God Bless Ozzy Osbourne, produced by his son Jack, Osbourne sheepishly admitted that he could not even remember when Louis and Jessica were born.

Osbourne married his manager Sharon Arden on 4 July 1982 and the couple had three children together, Aimee (born 2 September 1983), Kelly (born 27 October 1984), and Jack (born 8 November 1985). He later confessed that the well-known "Fourth of July" US Independence Day date was chosen so that he would never forget his anniversary. Guitarist Randy Rhoads predicted in 1981 that the couple would "probably get married someday" despite their constant bickering and the fact that Osbourne was still married to Thelma at the time. Osbourne has numerous grandchildren.

Osbourne wrote a song for his daughter Aimee, which appeared as a B-side on the album Ozzmosis. At the end of the song, said daughter can be heard saying "I'll always be your angel", referring to the song's chorus lyrics. The song "My Little Man", which appears on Ozzmosis, was written about his son Jack. The Osbourne family divide their time between their Buckinghamshire mansion and a home in Los Angeles, California.

Though Osbourne has long been accused of being a Satanist, it was reported by The New York Times in 1992 that he was a practicing member of the Church of England and prayed before each show. In 2002, Osbourne and wife Sharon were invited to the White House Correspondents' Association dinner by Fox News Channel correspondent Greta Van Susteren for that year's event. Then-President George W. Bush noted Osbourne's presence by joking, "The thing about Ozzy is, he's made a lot of big hit recordings – 'Party with the Animals', 'Sabbath Bloody Sabbath', 'Facing Hell', 'Black Skies' and 'Bloodbath in Paradise'. Ozzy, Mom loves your stuff."

Ozzy and his wife are one of the UK's richest couples, according to the Sunday Times Rich List. They ranked at number 458 in 2005, with an estimated £100 million earned from recording, touring, and TV shows. Osbourne has over 15 tattoos, the most famous of which are the letters O-Z-Z-Y across the knuckles of his left hand. This was his first tattoo, created by himself as a teenager with a sewing needle and pencil lead. A longtime fan of the comedy troupe Monty Python, in a 2010 interview with Us Weekly Osbourne stated, "My favourite movie is Monty Python's Life of Brian". Osbourne suffered minor burns after a small house fire in January 2013. On his 65th birthday on 3 December 2013, he asked fans to celebrate his birthday by donating to the Royal Marsden cancer charity in London.

On 6 February 2019, Osbourne was hospitalised in an undisclosed location on his doctor's advice due to flu complications, postponing the European leg of his "No More Tours 2" tour. The issue was described as a "severe upper-respiratory infection" following a bout with the flu which his doctor feared could develop into pneumonia, given the physicality of the live performances and an extensive travel schedule throughout Europe in harsh winter conditions. Pneumonia targets the airway and breathing and is frequently fatal in elderly patients, necessitating the preventive measures. 

By 12 February 2019, Osbourne had been moved to intensive care. Tour promoters Live Nation said in a statement that they were hopeful that Osbourne would be "fit and healthy" and able to honour tour dates in Australia and New Zealand in March. Osbourne later cancelled the tour entirely, and ultimately all shows scheduled for 2019, after sustaining serious injuries from a fall in his Los Angeles home while still recovering from pneumonia. He was diagnosed with Parkinson's disease in February 2019, which he publicly revealed in January 2020. 

In February 2020, Osbourne cancelled the 2020 North American tour, seeking treatment in Switzerland until April.

Drug and alcohol use
Osbourne has misused alcohol and other drugs for most of his adult life. He admitted to Sounds in 1978, "I get high, I get fucked up ... what the hell's wrong with getting fucked up? There must be something wrong with the system if so many people have to get fucked up ... I never take dope or anything before I go on stage. I'll smoke a joint or whatever afterwards." Black Sabbath bandmate Tony Iommi said that while all the band were involved with alcohol and other drugs to various degrees in the 1970s, Osbourne had the unhealthiest lifestyle of them all. Despite this, said Iommi, he was typically the only one left standing when the others were "out for the count". Longtime guitarist Zakk Wylde has attributed Osbourne's longevity in spite of decades of substance misuse to "a very special kind of fortitude that's bigger than King Kong and Godzilla combined... seriously, he's hard as nails, man!"

Osbourne's first experience with cocaine was in early 1971 at a hotel in Denver, Colorado, after a show Black Sabbath had done with Mountain. He states that Mountain's guitarist, Leslie West, introduced him to the drug. Though West is reluctant to take credit for introducing Osbourne to cocaine, Osbourne remembers the experience quite clearly: "When you come from Aston and you fall in love with cocaine, you  when you started. It's like having your first fuck!" Osbourne says that upon first trying the drug, "The world went a bit fuzzy after that."

Osbourne claimed to have taken LSD every day for two years while in Black Sabbath. During the end of his time with the band, he said he "got very drunk and very stoned every single day."

Osbourne's drug and alcohol misuse have at times caused friction within his band. Don Airey, keyboardist for Osbourne during his early solo career, has said that the vocalist's substance-misuse issues were what ultimately caused him to leave the band. In his memoir Off the Rails, former bassist Rudy Sarzo detailed the frustrations felt by him and his bandmates as they coped with life on the road with the vocalist, who was in a state of near-constant inebriation and was often so hungover that he would refuse to perform. When he was able to perform, his voice was often so damaged from cigarettes, alcohol, and drugs that the performance suffered. Many shows on the American leg of the 1981-82 Diary of a Madman tour were simply cancelled, and the members of his band quickly began to tire of the unpredictability, coupled with the often violent mood swings he was prone to when either drunk or high.

Osbourne claims in his autobiography that he was invited in 1981 to a meeting with the head of CBS Europe in Germany. Intoxicated, he decided to lighten the mood by performing a striptease on the table and then kissing the record executive on the lips. According to his wife Sharon, he had actually performed a goose-step up and down the table and urinated in the executive's wine, but was too drunk to remember.

On 18 February 1982, while wearing his future wife Sharon's dress for a photoshoot near the Alamo, Osbourne drunkenly urinated on a cenotaph erected in honour of those who died at the Battle of the Alamo in Texas, across the street from the actual building. A police officer arrested Osbourne, and he was subsequently banned from the city of San Antonio for a decade. Osbourne had been on a long drinking binge and earlier that same day had drunkenly fired his entire band, including Randy Rhoads, after they had informed him that they would not participate in a planned live album of Black Sabbath songs. He also physically attacked Rhoads and Rudy Sarzo in a hotel bar that morning, and Sharon informed the band that she feared he had "finally snapped". Osbourne later had no memory of firing his band and the tour continued, though his relationship with Rhoads never fully recovered. In May 1984, Osbourne was arrested in Memphis, Tennessee, again for public intoxication. The most notorious incident came in August 1989, when Sharon claimed that Ozzy had tried to strangle her after returning home from the  Moscow Music Peace Festival, in a haze of alcohol and drugs. The incident led Ozzy to six months in rehabilitation, after which time, Sharon regained her faith in her husband and did not press charges.

Though he has managed to remain clean and sober for extended periods in recent years, Osbourne has frequently commented on his former wild lifestyle, expressing bewilderment at his own survival through 40 years of drug and alcohol misuse. Upon being fired from Black Sabbath in 1979, Osbourne spent the next three months locked in his hotel room taking vast amounts of alcohol and other drugs all day, every day. He claims that he would certainly have died if his future wife Sharon had not offered to manage him as a solo artist.

In 2003, Osbourne told the Los Angeles Times how he was nearly incapacitated by medication prescribed by a Beverly Hills doctor. The doctor was alleged to have prescribed 13,000 doses of 32 drugs in one year. However, after a nine-year investigation by the Medical Board of California, the Beverly Hills physician was exonerated of all charges of excessive prescribing.

Osbourne experienced tremors for some years and linked them to his continuous drug misuse. In May 2005, he found out it was actually Parkin, a genetic condition, the symptoms of which are similar to Parkinson's disease. Osbourne will have to take daily medication for the rest of his life to combat the involuntary shudders associated with the condition. Osbourne has also shown symptoms of mild hearing loss, as depicted in the television show, The Osbournes, where he often asks his family to repeat what they say. At the TEDMED Conference in October 2010, scientists from Knome, a Massachusetts human genome interpretation company, joined Osbourne on stage to discuss their analysis of Osbourne's whole genome, which shed light on how the famously hard-living rocker has survived decades of drug misuse.

In April 2013, Osbourne revealed through Facebook that he had resumed smoking, drinking and doing drugs for the past year and a half, stating he "was in a very dark place" but said he had been sober again since early March. He also apologised to Sharon, his family, friends, bandmates and his fans for his "insane" behaviour during that period. In a February 2021 interview with Variety, Ozzy and his son Jack (who has been sober for 17 years) opened up about their recovery. Ozzy admitted to having been sober for about seven years.

Controversy

Throughout his career, many religious groups have accused Osbourne of being a negative influence on teenagers, stating that his genre of rock music has been used to glorify Satanism. Scholar Christopher M. Moreman compared the controversy to those levelled against the occultist Aleister Crowley. Both were demonised by the media and some religious groups for their antics. Although Osbourne tempts the comparison with his song "Mr. Crowley", he denies being a Satanist; conversely, it has been reported that Osbourne is a member of the Church of England and that he prays before taking the stage each night before every concert.

In 1981, after signing his first solo career record deal, Osbourne bit the head off a dove during a meeting with CBS Records executives in Los Angeles. Apparently, he had planned to release doves into the air as a sign of peace, but due to being intoxicated at the time, he instead grabbed a dove and bit its head off. He then spat the head out, with blood still dripping from his lips. Due to its controversy, the head-biting act has been parodied and alluded to several times throughout his career and is part of what made Osbourne famous.

On 20 January 1982, Osbourne bit the head off a bat that he thought was rubber while performing at the Veterans Memorial Auditorium in Des Moines, Iowa. According to a 2004 Rolling Stone article, the bat was alive at the time; however, 17-year-old Mark Neal, who threw it onto the stage, said it was brought to the show dead. According to Osbourne in the booklet to the 2002 edition of Diary of a Madman, the bat was not only alive but managed to bite him, resulting in Osbourne being treated for rabies. On 20 January 2019, Osbourne commemorated the 37th anniversary of the bat incident by offering an 'Ozzy Plush Bat' toy "with detachable head" for sale on his personal web-store. The site claimed the first batch of toys sold out within hours.

On New Year's Eve 1983, Canadian youth James Jollimore killed a woman and her two sons in Halifax, Nova Scotia, after listening to the "Bark at the Moon" song. A friend of the murderer quoted: "Jimmy said that every time he listened to the song he felt strange inside ... He said when he heard it on New Year's Eve he went out and stabbed someone".

In 1984, California teenager John McCollum committed suicide while listening to Osbourne's "Suicide Solution". The song deals with the dangers of alcohol misuse. McCollum's suicide led to allegations that Osbourne promoted suicide in his songs. Despite knowing McCollum had clinical depression, his parents sued Osbourne (McCollum v. CBS) for their son's death, saying the lyrics in the song, "Where to hide, suicide is the only way out. Don't you know what it's really about?" convinced McCollum to commit suicide. The family's lawyer suggested that Osbourne should be criminally charged for encouraging a young person to commit suicide, but the courts ruled in Osbourne's favour, saying there was no connection between the song and McCollum's suicide. Osbourne was sued for the same reason in 1991 (Waller v. Osbourne), by the parents of Michael Waller, for $9 million, but the courts once again ruled in Osbourne's favour.

In lawsuits filed in 2000 and 2002 which were dismissed by the courts in 2003, former band members Bob Daisley, Lee Kerslake, and Phil Soussan stated that Osbourne was delinquent in paying them royalties and had denied them due credit on albums they played on. In November 2003, a Federal Appeals Court unanimously upheld the dismissal by the US District Court for the Central District of California of the lawsuit brought by Daisley and Kerslake. The US Court of Appeals for the Ninth Circuit ruled that Osbourne does not owe any royalties or credit to the former band members who were let go in 1981. To resolve further issues, management chose to replace Daisley and Kerslake's contributions on the original masters, replacing them with Robert Trujillo on bass and Mike Bordin on drums. The albums were then reissued. The original tracks have since been restored in accordance with the 30th anniversary of those albums.

In July 2010, Osbourne and Tony Iommi decided to discontinue the court proceedings over ownership of the Black Sabbath trademark. As reported to Blabbermouth, "Both parties are glad to put this behind them and to cooperate for the future and would like it to be known that the issue was never personal, it was always business."

Band members

Current members:
 Ozzy Osbourne – vocals (1979–present)
 Zakk Wylde – lead guitar (1987–1992, 1995, 1998, 2001–2004, 2006–2009, 2017–present)
 Rob "Blasko" Nicholson – bass (2003, 2006–present)
 Adam Wakeman – keyboards, rhythm guitar (2004–present)
 Tommy Clufetos – drums (2010–present)

Discography

Solo

Studio albums
 Blizzard of Ozz (1980)
 Diary of a Madman (1981)
 Bark at the Moon (1983)
 The Ultimate Sin (1986)
 No Rest for the Wicked (1988)
 No More Tears (1991)
 Ozzmosis (1995)
 Down to Earth (2001)
 Under Cover (2005)
 Black Rain (2007)
 Scream (2010)
 Ordinary Man (2020)
 Patient Number 9 (2022)

Black Sabbath

Studio albums
 Black Sabbath (1970)
 Paranoid (1970)
 Master of Reality (1971)
 Vol. 4 (1972)
 Sabbath Bloody Sabbath (1973)
 Sabotage (1975)
 Technical Ecstasy (1976)
 Never Say Die! (1978)
 13 (2013)

Tours
 Blizzard of Ozz Tour (1980–1981)
 Diary of a Madman Tour (1981–1982)
 Speak of the Devil Tour (1982–1983)
 Bark at the Moon Tour (1983–1985)
 The Ultimate Sin Tour (1986)
 No Rest for the Wicked Tour (1988–1989)
 Theatre of Madness Tour (1991–1992)
 No More Tours Tour (1992)
 Retirement Sucks Tour (1995–1996)
 The Ozzman Cometh Tour (1998)
 Merry Mayhem Tour (2001)
 Down to Earth Tour (2002)
 Black Rain Tour (2008)
 Scream World Tour (2010–2011)
 Ozzy and Friends Tour (2012)
 No More Tours II (2018)

Filmography
 Trick or Treat (1986) – Rev. Aaron Gilstrom
 The Decline of Western Civilization Part II: The Metal Years (1988) – Himself (Documentary)
 The Jerky Boys: The Movie (1995) – Band Manager
 South Park (1999) – Himself (voice)
 Little Nicky (2000) –  Himself
 Moulin Rouge! (2001) – The Green Fairy (voice)
 Austin Powers in Goldmember (2002) – Himself
 Dame Edna Live at the Palace (2003) 
 Robbie the Reindeer in Close Encounters of the Herd Kind (2007) – Vicar (voice)
 Brütal Legend (2009) (video game) – The Guardian of Metal, Dadbat (voice)
 Gnomeo & Juliet (2011) – Fawn (voice)
 Fish Hooks (2011) – Earth Troll (voice)
 Howard Stern on Demand (2013) – Himself
 Bubble Guppies (2015) – Sid Fishy (voice)
 Ghostbusters (2016) – Himself
 The 7D (2016) – Duke the Drear (voice)
 Sherlock Gnomes (2018) – Fawn (voice)
Rockfield: The Studio On The Farm (2020) – Himself
 Trolls World Tour (2020) – King Thrash

References

External links

 
 
 Ozzfest Information
 Ozzy Osbourne Live Photo Gallery

Ozzy Osbourne
1948 births
20th-century Anglicans
20th-century English male singers
21st-century Anglicans
21st-century English male singers
Black Sabbath members
British harmonica players
English expatriates in the United States
English Anglicans
English autobiographers
English heavy metal singers
English rock singers
Grammy Award winners
Kerrang! Awards winners
Living people
Musicians from Birmingham, West Midlands
Obscenity controversies in music
Ozzy
Participants in American reality television series
People from Chalfont St Giles
People from Hidden Hills, California
The Ozzy Osbourne Band members
Musicians with dyslexia
People with Parkinson's disease
Glam metal musicians
WWE Hall of Fame inductees